Hồ Quang Minh (born 1949 in Hanoi, died 2020 in Ho Chi Minh City) is a Vietnamese-born Swiss film director.

Biography
Hồ Quang Minh left Vietnam to study in Switzerland about 1962, then worked in France as an assistant on Lê Lâm's Poussière d'empire, before studying in Switzerland and taking Swiss citizenship.

In 1966, his film Gone, Gone Forever Gone was selected as the Vietnamese entry for the Best Foreign Language Film at the 69th Academy Awards, but it was not nominated.

Filmography
 Phường tôi (French title Mon Quartier), documentary 28 min, video, (1982)
 Con thú tật nguyền (French and English title Karma), drama 100 min, 35 mm, (1985) - war film
 Trang giấy trắng (French Page Blanche), drama 100 min, 35 mm, (1991)
 Bụi hồng (English, from Sanskrit Gate Gate Paragate), drama 85 min, 35 mm, (1996)
 Thời xa vắng (English A Time Far Past, French Le Temps Révolu), (2004) Film music by Đặng Hữu Phúc

See also

Trần Quang
Trần Quang Đại
Trần Anh Hùng
Lê Hoàng Hoa
Lê Cung Bắc
Hồng Sến
Long Vân
Đặng Nhật Minh

References

Lê Quang Thanh Tâm, Điện ảnh miền Nam trôi theo dòng lịch sử, Hochiminh City Culture & Arts Publishing House, Saigon, 2015.

1949 births
Living people
Vietnamese Roman Catholics
People from Hanoi
Swiss film directors
Vietnamese film directors
Vietnamese emigrants to Switzerland
Naturalised citizens of Switzerland
Vietnamese expatriates in France
Vietnamese expatriates in Russia